The Bahamas competed at the 1964 Summer Olympics in Tokyo, Japan.  The nation won its first ever Olympic gold medal.

Medalists

Athletics

Men
Track & road events

Field events

Sailing

Open

See also
Bahamas at the 1963 Pan American Games

References
Official Olympic Reports
International Olympic Committee results database
sports-reference

Nations at the 1964 Summer Olympics
1964
Olympics